Mahmudabad (also Romanized as Maḩmūdābād) is a village in Maharlu Rural District, Kuhenjan District, Sarvestan County, Fars Province, Iran. At the 2006 census, its population was 596, in 134 families.

References 

Populated places in Sarvestan County